Andaru Dongale is a 1974 Indian Telugu-language film directed by V. B. Rajendra Prasad. It is a remake of 1972 Bollywood film Victoria No. 203. It is a commercial hit and ran for more than 100 days in 3 centres.

Credits
Sobhan Babu as Kumar
Lakshmi as Lakshmi
S. V. Ranga Rao as Chanti Babu
Nagabhushanam as Bujji Babu
Kaikala Satyanarayana as Durga Rao
Prabhakar Reddy as Gundu
Rao Gopal Rao as Ranjit
Mukkamala as Jailer
Raja Babu as Dhairyam
Ramana Reddy as Constable
Tyagaraju as Jaggu
Y. V. Raju as Dharmaiah
Venkateswara Rao as Subbaiah
K. V. Chalam
Rama Prabha as Gowri
Jayakumari as Kantha

Soundtrack
 "Chantibabu O Bujjibabu" - Madhavapeddi Satyam, S. P. Balasubrahmanyam
 "Chusanura Ee Vela" -
 "Gudugudu Guncham Gunderagam" -
 "Gurudeva Mahadeva" -
 "Naayudolla Inti Kaada Nallatumma Chettu Kinda" -

Box-office
The film ran for more than 100 days in Hyderabad, Vijayawada and Visakhapatnam.

References

1974 films
1970s spy thriller films
Indian spy thriller films
Telugu remakes of Hindi films
Films scored by K. V. Mahadevan
1970s Telugu-language films